Haikal Hasnol is a Singaporean footballer currently playing as a goalkeeper  for Home United.

Club career

Haikal signed for Home United on loan in 2019 and made his debut in the AFC match against Kaya FC. 

Haikal made his Sleague debut against Balestier Khalsa FC with a 4-1 win at home. He made 4 appearances for the club in 2017. Ending the season with a goalless draw against Home United.

Career statistics

Club

Notes

References

Living people
Singaporean footballers
Singapore Premier League players
Tampines Rovers FC players
Home United FC players
1995 births
Association football goalkeepers